The 1996 Supercopa Libertadores Finals was a two-legged football series to determine the winner of the 1996 Supercopa Libertadores. The finals were contested by Argentine club Vélez Sarsfield and Brazilian side Cruzeiro and held in November–December 1996.

In the first leg, held in Estadio Mineirão in Belo Horizonte, Vélez Sarsfield beat Cruzeiro 1–0. In the second leg, played at José Amalfitani Stadium, Velez Sarsfield was also the winner by 2–0 totalizing 3–0 on aggregate, in order to claim their first Supercopa Libertadores title.

Qualified teams

Venues

Match details

First leg

Second leg

References

1
Football in Buenos Aires
Supercopa Libertadores 1996
Supercopa Libertadores 1996
Supercopa Libertadores Finals